Little Whiteface River may refer to:

 Little Whiteface River (North)
 Little Whiteface River (South)

See also 
 Whiteface (disambiguation)